SPQ may refer to:
SPQ Libre, Syndicalistes et progressistes pour un Québec libre, Quebec political party
Ossa SPQ, OSSA Seurat Piron Queyrel, air-cooled 250 cc road racing motorcycle with an OSSA engine and a light frame produced in France in the 1970s.